Home Grown is the third studio album by American alternative country group Blue Mountain, released in 1997.

Critical reception
The Washington Post praised "Hudson's affection for the odd characters who inhabit, or sometimes just float through, small Southern towns."

AllMusic wrote: "Homegrown is informed by melodic smarts absent from so many contemporary alt-country records; [Cary] Hudson's parched, Dylan-esque vocals remain wonderfully evocative as well, helping establish an authentic sense of time and place."

Track listing
"Bloody 98"
"Myrna Lee"
"Pretty Please"
"Black Dog"
"Generic America"
"Last Words of Midnight Clyde"
"Babe"
"It Ain't Easy to Love a Liar"
"Ira Magee"
"Town Clown"
"Dead End Street"
"Rain"

References

1998 albums
Blue Mountain (band) albums
Roadrunner Records albums